Ayşe Diker (born 8 March 1984) is a Turkish former swimmer, who specialized in butterfly events. She represented Turkey, as a 16-year-old, at the 2000 Summer Olympics, and held a total of 25 Turkish records in swimming, including the 200 m butterfly. An active member of Galatasaray Spor Kulübü in her sporting career, Diker also trained for the St. Bonaventure Bonnies swimming and diving team, under head coach Lance Brennan, from 2003 to 2007.

Diker competed only in the women's 100 m butterfly at the 2000 Summer Olympics in Sydney. She achieved a FINA B-cut of 1:03.67 from the Speedo Turkish Open Championships in Istanbul. She challenged six other swimmers in heat two, including two-time Olympians Hsieh Shu-ting and María del Pilar Pereyra. Coming from fourth at the final turn, Diker held off a sprint battle from Pereyra by a tenth of a second (0.10) to grab a third seed in 1:04.65. Diker failed to advance into the semifinals, as she placed forty-second overall on the first day of prelims.

References

External links
Player Bio – St. Bonaventure Bonnies

1984 births
Living people
Turkish female swimmers
Olympic swimmers of Turkey
Swimmers at the 2000 Summer Olympics
Female butterfly swimmers
St. Bonaventure Bonnies women's swimmers